This is a list of female hereditary monarchs who reigned over a political jurisdiction in their own right or by right of inheritance. The list does not include female regents (see List of regents), usually the mother of the monarch, male or female, for although they exercised political power during the period of regency on behalf of their child or children, they were not hereditary monarch, and thus cannot be included in the list of female hereditary monarchs.

Each entry contains the name (with years of birth–death) and span of reign in years (where available). Where necessary, the source of inheritance right is indicated, that is, whether they succeeded from their fathers, mothers, siblings or other relatives. Cases where succession was obtained by other means (usurpation or marriage, for example) are also indicated accordingly.

A
 Ada of Caria (fl. 377–326 BC) Queen of Caria
 Ada of Holland
 Adalais of Aquitaine, Viscountess of Auvillars and Lomagne
 Adelaide, Countess of Auxerre (1262–?)
 Adelaide I of Auxerre, Countess of Auxerre, 853–864
 Adelaide II of Burgundy, Countess of Auxerre, 921–936
 Adelaide, Countess Palatine of Burgundy, Countess Palatine of Burgundy, 1248–79
 Adelaide of Burgundy, also known as Adelaide of Chalon (941–?), Countess of Troyes, Countess of Beaume, Countess of Chalon-sur-Saône
 Adelaide of Donzy, Countess of Gien
 Adelaide of Normandy, Countess of Aumale, 1069–90
 Adelaide of Provence (d. 1129), also known as Adelaide of Forcalquier, Lady of Forcalquier, 1065–1129, Countess of Provence
 Adelaide of Soissons (d. 1066), Countess of Soissons
 Adelaide of Susa (1020–1091), Countess of Turin, Lady of Auriate, Bredulo, Asti, Alba, Albenga and Ventimiglia
 Adelaide of Vermandois (1065–1102), Countess of Valois, Countess of Vermandois
 Adelais, Lady of Venisy (d. 1221), Lady of Venisy
 Adelasia of Torres, Judge of Logudoro, 1236–59
 Adele of Anjou, Countess of Vendôme, 1016–32
 Adele of Valois, Countess of Valois, Countess of Crespy
 Adelheid of Heinsberg, Countess of Heinsberg
 Adelheid of Kyburg, Countess of Kyburg
 Adelheid of Gelder (d. after 1150), Heiress of the stewardship (Ger. vogtei) of the Bishopric of Munster
 Adelicia of Sanseverino, Lady of Serino, 1283–?
 Adeline of Meulan (1014–81), Countess of Meulan, ?–1081
 Adelvie of Guise, Lady of Guise
 Adrienne of Estouteville, also known as Adrienne of Bourbon, (1512–1560), Duchess of Estouteville, Lady of Hambye, Gace and Briquebec
 Adyle of Carlat, Viscountess of Carlat
 Aelis of Troyes (d. 1066), Countess of Troyes and Soissons
 Ælfwynn, Lady of the Mercians, 918–919
 Æthelflæd, Lady of the Mercians, 911–918
 Agalbursa, Judge of Arborea, c. 1186
 Agathe of Dammartin (d. 1268), Lady of Ponthieu
 Agathe of Poitiers-Valentinois, Lady of Baux, 1348–?
 Agnes de Percy, Heiress of the Percys
 Agnès de Tarroja inherited the Lordships of Solsona, Arbeca and Tarroja; wife of Ramon Folc IV, Viscount of Cardona
 Agnes of Adelon, Lady of Adelon, c. 1200
 Agnes of Austria (1322–1392), daughter of Leopold I, duchess in Silesia
 Agnes of Baudemont (1130–1210), Lady of Baudemont, La Fere-en-Tardenois and Longueville, Lady of Nesle, Lady of Pontarcy, Lady of Quincy, Countess of Braine
 Agnes of Bourbon (d. 1288), Lady of Bourbon
 Agnes of Burgundy, Countess of Montbeliard, 1332–?
 Agnes of Cleves (d. 1267), Heiress of Cleves and Heinsberg
 Agnes II of Donzy (1199–1225), Dame of Donzy, 1222–25
 Agnes of Faucigny (d. 1268), Lady of Faucigny
 Agnes of Gournay-sur-Marne (d. 1143), Lady of Rochefort, Lady of Gournay-sur-Marne and Gomets, Countess of Rochefort
 Agnes of Montferrat (1180–1208), Latin Empress of Constantinople
 Agnes I of Nevers, Countess of Auxerre and Nevers, 1181–92
 Agnes of Ponthieu (c. 1080–1105/1111), Countess of Ponthieu. 1100–bef. 1105
 Agnes of Thiern, also known as Alix of Thiern, Lady of Montpensier
 Ahhotep I (c. 1560–1530 BC), Queen of Egypt, regent for her son Ahmose I
 Ahilyabai Holkar Maharani (1725–1795) the Holkar Queen of the Maratha ruled Malwa kingdom, India
 Ahmose-Nefertari, Queen of Egypt, regent for her son Amenhotep I
 Aikaterina Asanina Zaccariaina (d. 1462), Titular Lady of Arcadia; Heiress of the Principality of Achaia
 Algayette, Lady
 Alheidis of Heinsberg (d. after 1207), Heinress of Heinsberg
 Alheidis of Sayn (d. c. 1303), Heiress of Hulchrath and Saffenberg (Daughter of Henry I of Sayn (d. 1259) and Agnes of Cleves (d. 1267), Heiress of Cleves and Heinsberg; married Dietrich VI of Cleves (d. 1275)
 Alice de la Roche-sur-l'Ognon (d. after 1277), Lady of Beirut
 Alice de Lacy (1281–1348), 4th Countess of Lincoln, 1311–48, 4th Countess of Salisbury, 1311–48, Countess of Lancaster, Leicester and Derby
 Alice Montague, 5th Countess of Salisbury
 Alice of Brittany (1243–1288), Lady of Pontarcy
 Alienor of Champagne, Countess of Bar-sur-Aube
 Alix de la Tour du Pin (v. 1280–1309), Dauphine of Viennois, 1307–09
 Alix of Alençon (d. after 1220), Lady of Montgomery
 Alix of Burgundy (1258–1261), Countess of Macon and Vienne, 1224–39
 Alix of Burgundy (1251–1290), Lady of Montjoy, Lady of Valencay, Countess of Auxerre, 1261–90
 Alix of Chacenay (d. 1278), Lady of Chacenay
 Alix of Clermont (d. 1330), Viscountess of Chateaudun
 Alix of Dammartin, Countess of Dammartin
 Alix of Dreux (1255–1296), Viscountess of Chateaudun, 1259–96, which she inherited from her mother Clemence of Chateaudun
 Alix of Dreux (1364–?), Viscountess of Dreux
 Alix of Dreux-Beu (1255–1275), Viscountess of Chateaudun, Lady of Montdoubleau
 Alix of Eu (d. 1246), Lady of Hastings and Countess of Eu, 1191–1246
 Alix of Flanders (1322–1346), Lady of Richebourg
 Alix of France (1160–1225), Lady of Arques, Countess of Eu and Vexins
 Alix of Meran, Countess Palatine of Burgundy, 1248–79
 Alix of Montfort (1218–1255), also known as Alix de Bigorre, Viscountess of Marsan and Countess of Bigorre, 1251–55
 Alix of Thouars, Countess of Richmond & Duchess of Brittany, 1203–21
 Almodis of La Marche (d. 1116), Countess of La Marche
 Alveradis of Saffenberg, Lady of Maubach
 Amalia of Dohna-Vianen (1645–1700), Sovereign Lady and Heiress of Vianen and Ameiden, Heiress Burgravine of Utrecht
 Amalie of Zweibrücken, Lady of Rixingen, 1547–77
 Ameline of Guise (1159–1185), Lady of Guise
 Amanirenas (40–10 BC) Queen regnant of Kush
 Amanishakheto (10 BC – 1 AD) Queen regnant of Kush
 Amastrine (d. 284 BC) ruler of Heraclea
 Amicia of Gloucester (1160–1225), Countess of Gloucester, 1217
 Amicia, Countess of Leicester, Countess of Leicester
 Amoene of Daun-Falkenstein, Heiress of Limburg
 Anastasia of Isenburg (1400–30), Heiress of Wied
 Andregota Galindez, Countess of Aragon, 922–925
 Anna of Jever, Lady of Jever, 1511–36
 Anna of Kyburg, Countess of Kyburg
 Anna of Stolberg (d. 1436), Countess of Stolberg
 Anna of Tecklenburg (1527–1582), Heiress of Tecklenburg and Rheda
 Anna of Wevelinghoven, Heiress of Wevelinghoven and Lievendael
 Anna Anachoutlou Komnena, Empress of Trebizond, 1341, 1341–42
 Anna Balbo Lascaris (1487–1554), Countess of Tenda, Lady of Mauro, Prela, Villanuovo, Mentone and Antibes
 Anna Lascaris, Countess of Tenda, Lady of Ventimiglia
 Anna Maria of Piombino, Princess of Piombino, 1699–1700
 Anne Boleyn, Marquess of Pembroke
 Lady Anne Clifford (1590–1676)
 Anne of Alençon (d. 1562), Lady of La Guerche and Pouencé, 1525–62
 Anne, Countess of Auvergne, also known as Anne de la Tour d'Auvergne, Countess of Auvergne, 1501–24
 Anne of Auvergne (1358–1417), Lady of Mercœur and Countess of Forez, 1372–1417, Dauphine of Auvergne, 1399–1417
 Anne of Brittany, Countess of Étampes and Montfort-l'Aumary and Duchess of Brittany, 1488–1514
 Anne of Burgundy, Dauphine of Viennois, 1269–98
 Anne of Burgundy (d. 1301), Dauphine of Vienne, Countess of Vienne
 Anne of Chabannes, Countess of Dammartin
 Anne of Clermont, Lady of Baux, ?–1403
 Anne of Croy (1563–1635), Lady of Chimay
 Anne of Gloucester (1383–1438), Countess of Buckingham
 Anne, Queen of Great Britain (6 February 1665 – 1 August 1714)
 Anne of Lorraine, also known as Anne of Vaudemont, Countess of Maulevier, Duchess of Aumale, 1631–38
 Anne of Montmorency (1385–1466), also known as Anne of Laval, Anne of Montmorency-Laval, Lady of Laval, Vitre, Acquigny, Aubigne, Tinteniac, Becherel and Romille, 1414–29
 Anne of Rohan (1604–85), Princess of Guemene
 Anne de Beauchamp, 15th Countess of Warwick (1443–1449), 15th Countess of Warwick, 1445–49
 Anne de Mowbray (1472–81), 8th Countess of Norfolk, 1476–81
 Anne Genevieve of Bourbon-Conde (1619–1679), Duchess of Longueville
 Anne Marie Louise d'Orléans, Duchess of Montpensier (1627–1693), also known as Anne Marie Louise of Bourbon-Montpensier, la Grande Mademoiselle, Countess of Eu, 1627–81, Countess of Mortain, 1660–93, Princess of Dombes & La-Roche-sur-Yon, 1627–81, Princess of Joinville, 1627–89, Duchess of Saint-Fergau, 1627–81, Duchess of Montpensier, 1627–93
 Anne Scott, 1st Duchess of Buccleuch Baroness of Whitchester and Ashdale, Countess of Dalkeith, and Duchess of Buccleuch, 1663–1732
 Antoinette of Bauffremont, Countess of Charny
 Antoinette of Bourbon (1493–1583), Duchess of Guise
 Antonia Enriquez de Ribera y Portocarrero (d. 1623), Duchess of Huescar
 Arsinde, Viscountess of Rocaberti and Perelada
 Arsinoe II (316 BC – 270/260 BC) Ptolemaic Pharaoh of Egypt, co-ruler with her husband 
 Artemisia I of Caria (around 480 BC) Queen of Halicarnassus
 Artemisia II of Caria (d. 350 BC) Queen of Caria
 Athaliah (c. 841–835 BC) Queen regnant of Judea
 Attala of Macon, Viscountess of Macon
 Aurembiaix of Urgel (d. 1231), Countess of Urgell
 Ava of Barcelona, Countess of Cerdanya and Besalu, 927–940
 Avantibai Lodhi the -warrior-queen (d. March 20, 1858), the ruler of the Indian state of Ramgarh
 Aveline of Nemours (d. 1191/1196), Lady of Nemours
 Azaline of Fezensac, also known as Adalmure of Fezensac, Countess of Fezensac

B
 Barbara of Daun (d. 1547), Lady of Rixingen
 Barthe, Viscountess of Marsan
 Béatrice of Albon (1161–1228), Dauphine of Viennois, Countess of Albon, Grenoble, Oisans and Briancon, 1162–1228
 Beatrice I of Bigorre, Countess of Bigorre, 1055–95
 Beatrice II of Bigorre, Viscountess of Fezensac and Countess of Bigorre, 1112–14
 Beatrice III of Bigorre (1104–1156), Countess of Bigorre, 1128–?
 Beatrice IV of Bigorre, Viscountess of Marsan 1185–?
 Beatrice of Bourbon (1320–83), Lady of Creil
 Beatrice I, Countess of Burgundy, Countess Palatine of Burgundy
 Beatrice II, Countess of Burgundy, Countess Palatine of Burgundy, 1205–31
 Beatrice of Clermont (d. c. 1364), Countess of Charolais, 1316–64
 Beatrice of Montfort (d. 1311), Lady of Rochefort, Countess of Montfort-l'Aumary
 Beatrice of Portugal (1373–c. 1420), titular Queen of Portugal, Consort Queen of Castile and León
 Beatrice of Provence (1234–1267), Lady of Forcalquier & Countess of Provence, 1245–67
 Beatrice of Sabran (1182–1248), Countess of Gap and Embrun, Lady of Caylar
 Beatrice of Savoy, also known as la Grande Dauphine, Lady of Faucigny, 1268–? which she inherited from her mother, Agnes of Faucigny
 Beatrice of Savoy, Countess of Forcalquier and Gap, 1245–56
 Beatrice of Thiers, also known as Beatrice of Thiern, (1174–1228) Countess of Chalon-sur-Saône, 1202–27
 Beatrice Ferillo, Heiress of Muro Lucano
 Beatriu de Montcada Heiress of Moncada
 Beatrix of Burgundy, Countess of Vienne, 1224
 Beatrix, Lady
 Beatrix of Burgundy (b. 1216–?), Lady of Montreal
 Beatrix of Burgundy (1257–1310), Lady of Bourbon, Lady of Saint-Just, Countess of Charolais
 Beatrix of Évreux (1392–1407), Duchess of Nemours
 Beatrix of Maine, Countess of Maine
 Beatrix of Montfort (1245–1312), Countess of Montfort-L’Aumary, 1249–12
 Beatrix of Putten (d. 1354), Lady of Putten and Strijen
 Beatrix of the Netherlands, Queen of the Netherlands, 1980–2013
 Benedetta of Cagliari, Judge of Cagliari, 1214–33
 Berenguela of Castile, Queen of Castile, 1217, Queen of León, 1217
 Berenice II of Egypt (267/266 BC – 221 BC) Queen of Cyrenaica, co-regent of Egypt
 Berenice III of Egypt (120 BC – 80 BC) co-regent, then sole queen of Egypt
 Berenice IV of Egypt (77 BC – 55 BC) Queen of Egypt
 Berta of Aumale, Countess of Aumale, 1048–52
 Bertha of Limburg, Heiress of Monschau, Montjoie
 Bertha of Rouergue, Countess of Rouergue, 953/954–1064
 Berthe of Cornouaille (1119–1157), Duchess of Brittany, 1148–57
 Berthe of Tuscany, Countess of Arles, 936–?
 Biru (1566–1624), Raja of Patani
 Blanche I of Navarre (1386–1441), Queen of Navarre
 Blanche II of Navarre (1424–1464), Queen of Navarre
 Blanca of Molina, Lady of Molina, 1248–93?
 Blanche of Aumale, Countess of Aumale, 1343–87
 Blanche of Dammartin, Lady of Nesle, Countess of Dammartin
 Blanche de Dreux (1270–1327), Lady of Brie-Comte-Robert
 Blanche of Lancaster (1345–1369), Duchess of Lancaster
 Blanche of Ponthieu (d. 1387), Lady of Montgomery, Countess of Aumale, 1343–87
 Bonne de la Roche, Joint Lady of Thebes, 1240
 Boudica, Queen of the Iceni
 Brianda de Beaumont (d. 1588), Countess of Lerin

C
 Caeria (4th century BC) Illyrian queen
 Camadevi (623 or 633–715 or 731) Queen of Hariphunchai
 Catalina of Castile, Viscountess of Limoges, 1317–28
 Caterina Cornaro, Queen of Cyprus, 1473–1489
 Catherine de' Medici, Lady of La Tour and Countess of Auvergne and Boulogne, 1524–89
 Catherine of Alençon, Countess of Mortain, 1412–1216
 Catherine of Appiano (1398–1451), also known as Caterina Appiani, Lady of Piombino, Scarlino, Populonia, Suvereto, Buriano, Abbadia al Fango and of the Isles of Elba, Montecristo and Pianosa, 1445–51
 Catherine of Bourbon-Conde (1575–1595), Marquise des Isles
 Catherine of Clermont (d. 1218), Countess of Clermont-en-Beauvaisis
 Catherine of Cleves (1548–1633), Countess of Eu, 1564–1633
 Catherine of Condé (1258–1329), Lady of Carency
 Catherine of Gemen (d. 1502), Heiress of Wevelinghoven
 Catherine of Gondi, Duchess of Retz, Duchess of Beaupreau
 Catherine of Guise, Duchess of Étampes, 1579–82
 Catherine of L'Isle-Bouchard (c. 1390–1474), Lady of Rochefort-sur-Loire
 Catherine of Navarre (1468–1517), Countess of Bigorre, Foix and Ribagorza, 1483–1517, Duchess of Gandia and Penafiel, and Queen of Navarre
 Catherine of Navarre (1558–1604), Duchess of Albret, Countess of Armagnac
 Catherine of Sully, Countess of Rochefort
 Catherine of Vendôme, Countess of Vendôme and Castres, 1374–93
 Catherine of Vendôme (1345–1412), Heiress of Vendôme
 Cecile of Rodez (d. 1314), Countess of Rodez
 Cecilia Sagredo, Lady of Paros, 1535–37
 Chand Bibi (1550–1599) ruler of Ahmednagar Sultanate, India
 Charlotte de Montmorency
 Charlotte of Albret (1480–1514), Lady of Chalus
 Charlotte of Armagnac (d. 1504), Countess of Guise & Duchess of Nemours, 1503–04
 Charlotte, Grand Duchess of Luxembourg (1896–1985), reigning Grand Duchess of Luxembourg from 1919 to 1964
 Charlotte of Nevers, Countess of Rethel, 1491–1500
 Chiraprapha (1499–1594) Queen of Lanna
 Christina, Queen of Sweden, Daughter of Gustavus Adolphus of Sweden
 Claire of Athens, Duchess of Athens, 1451
 Claude of France, Lady of Houdan and Neaufles, 1514–24, Countess of Aast, Blois, Coucy, Étampes and Montfort-L’Aumary, and Duchess of Brittany, 1514–24
 Claudine of Monaco (1451–1515), Lady of Monaco, 1457–58 (Abd).
 Clemence of Chateaudun (1229–1259), Viscountess of Chateaudun and Lady of Montdoubleau
 Cleopatra I Syra (204 BC – 176 BC) regent of Egypt
 Cleopatra II of Egypt (c. 185 BC – 116/115 BC) co-ruler of Egypt
 Cleopatra III of Egypt (c. 160 BC – 101 BC) co-ruler of Egypt
 Cleopatra IV of Egypt (c. 138/135 BC – 112 BC) co-ruler of Egypt
 Cleopatra V of Egypt (d. 69/68/57 BC) co-ruler of Egypt
 Cleopatra VII (51–47 BC) co-ruler then sole queen of Egypt
 Cleopatra of Macedon (355/354 – 308 BC) Queen regnant of Epirus
 Cleopatra Selene of Syria (135/140 – 69 BC) Queen regnant of Syria
 Comtessa Marguerite of Geneva (1160–?), Lady of Clermont-en-Beauvaisis.
 Constance of Antioch, Princess of Antioch, Lady of Laodicea and Gibel
 Constance of Béarn (d. 1310), Countess of Bigorre, Viscountess of Marsan, 1301–10
 Constance, Duchess of Brittany Countess of Richmond and Duchess of Brittany, 1166–96
 Constance I of Sicily, Queen of Sicily, 1194–98
 Constance II of Sicily, Queen of Sicily, 1266–1302
 Constanza de Antillón, Señora de Antillón and Heiress of Urgell
 Constanza de Montcada, Heiress of Moncada

D
 Diana de Borbon y Gagnon, Countess de Castile de Vigo
 Diane of Luxemburg-Saint-Pol (d. 1624), Duchess of Piney
 Dias of Muret, Lady of Sarraman and Saves
 Dorotea Orsini (d. 1665), Heiress of Solofra and Muro Lucano
 Douce, Countess of Pallars-Jussa
 Douce I of Gévaudan (1090–1129), also known as Douce of Rouergue, also known as Douce of Arles, Viscountess of Millau and Gévaudan, 1111–29 and Countess of Provence, 1115–30
 Douce II of Provence, Countess of Provence, 1166–67
 Durgavati Rani (1524–1564), ruler of Gond Kingdom, Central India
 Dynamis (67 BC – 8 AD) Roman client queen of the Bosporan Kingdom

E
 Ekaterine Dadiani, Princess Regent of Mingrelia, 1853–66
 Ela of Salisbury, 3rd Countess of Salisbury (c. 1187–1261), Countess of Salisbury, 1196
 Eleanor of Alburquerque (1374–1435), Lady of Alburquerque
 Eleanor of Aquitaine, Duchess of Aquitaine, 1137–1204
 Eleanor of Bourbon-La Marche (1407–1463), Countess of La Marche, 1435–62, Duchess of Nemours, 1425–62
 Eleanor of Castile (1241–1290), Countess of Montreuil & Ponthieu, 1279–90
 Eleanor of Navarre, Queen of Navarre
 Elena of Gallura, Judge of Gallura, 1203–17
 Eleonora of Arborea, Judge of Arborea, 1387–1408
 Eleonora of Roddi, Countess of Roddi, 1588–1620
 Eleonore of Roye (d. 1564), Lady of Conti
 Elisa Bonaparte, Princess of Lucca and Piombino, 1805–08; Duchess of Massa, 1805–14; Grand Duchess of Tuscany, 1809–14
 Elisabeth of Freiburg, Countess of Freiburg
 Elisabeth of Leiningen, Lady of Rixingen
 Elisabeth of Mansfeld, Countess of Mansfeld
 Elisabeth of Orlamunde (d. after 1363), Countess of Orlamunde
 Elisabeth of Saint-Pol (1179–1232), Countess of Saint-Pol, 1205–32
 Elisabeth of Sponheim, Countess of Sponheim-Kreutznach, 1414–17, Countess of Vianden, 1400–17
 Elisabeth of Saint-Pol (1179–1232), Lady of Ancre.
 Elizabeth Clifford (1613–1690/91), 2nd Baroness Clifford, 1643–91
 Elizabeth de Burgh, 4th Countess of Ulster, also known as Elizabeth of Ulster, 12th Lady of Clare, 1360–1363; 4th Countess of Ulster, 1333–63
 Elizabeth de Clare (1295–1360), also known as Elizabeth de Burgh, 11th Lady of Clare, 1314–60
 Elizabeth I (1533–1603)
 Elizabeth II (1926–2022)
 Elizabeth of Gorlitz (1390–1451), also known as Elizabeth of Luxemburg, Duchess of Gorlitz, Duchess of Luxemburg, 1411–41
 Elizabeth of Lippe-Alviderssen, Couyntess of Schaumburg, ?–1646
 Elvira Ramírez of León (c. 932–after 982), Lady of Toro
 Elvira de Lara, Lady of Subirats, 1209–20, Countess of Urgell, 1209–20
 Emma, Lady of Chateau-Gonthier
 Emma of Laval, heiress of Laval
 Emma of Provence, Countess of Provence, 1037–54
 Emma of Provence, Marquise of Provence, 1054–62
 Emme, Lady of Laval
 Eremburge de la Fleche (1091–1126), also known as Eremburge of Blois, Lady of Fleche & Countess of Maine & Mans, 1110–26, Lady of Chateau-du-Loir
 Ermengarde of Creyssel, Viscountess of Creyssel
 Ermengarde of Roussillon & Ampurias, Countess of Peyrepertuse
 Ermentrude of Roucy, Count of Macon, Countess of Besançon
 Ermesinde of Carcassonne, Regent Countess of Barcelona, 1018–23
 Ermesinde I of Luxemburg (1080–1143), Lady of Longwy & Countess of Luxemburg, 1136–43
 Ermesinde II of Luxemburg (1186–1247), also known as Ermesinde of Namur, Countess of Durbuy, Laroche & Luxemburg, 1196–1247
 Ermengarde of Narbonne-Pelet (d. 1176), also known as Ermessende Pelet d'Alais, Countess of Melgueil
 Ernestina of Sayn, Countess Sayn-Hachenburg, 1648–61
 Eschiva, Lady of Scandaleon, c. 1370
 Eschiva of Iblein (1253–1312), Lady of Beirut
 Eschiva of Montfort (d. bef. 1350), Lady of Beirut
 Esclaramunda de Pinés, Heiress of Canet
 Etazeta of Bithynia (fl. 255 BC – 254 BC) regent of Bithynia
 Etienne of Vienne, Countess of Vienne
 Euphrosyne of Vendôme, heiress of Vendôme

F
 Falquiline of Bigorre, Countess of Bigorre
 Felicitas of Beichlingen, Countess of Beichlingen
 Fiorenza Crispo (d. before 1483), Lady of Santorini, 1479–80
 Fiorenza Sanudo, Duchess of Naxos, 1361–71
 Francesca Acciajuoli, Duchess of Athens, 1394–95
 Françoise of Alençon (d. 1550), Lady of Beaumount-au-Maine, 1525–50
 Françoise of Amboise, Lady of Amboise, 1469–85
 Françoise of Châtillon, Viscountess of Limoges, 1456–81
 Françoise of Dinan (1436–1499), Lady of Chateaubriantis
 Françoise de Lorraine (1592–1669), Countess of Penthièvre, 1602–08, Duchess of Penthièvre, 1608–69, Duchess of Mercœur, 1602–49 (Resigned), Princess of Martigues
 Françoise of Penthièvre (1440–1481), Lady of Avesnes & Viscountess of Limoges & Lomagne, 1455–81, Countess of Périgord
 Françoise of Périgord (d. 1481), Countess of Périgord
 Françoise of Rohan (d. 1591), Duchess of Loudon.
 Fritigil (mid 4th century), Queen of the Marcomanni, last known ruler of the Germanic peoples

G
 Gabrielle d'Estrées (1571–1599), Marquise of Monceaux & Duchess of Beaufort & Duchess of Étampes, 1598–99
 Gaboimilla (c. 1500s), mythical queen of a tribe of Amazons in Southern Chile
 Gentile Brancaleoni (d. 1459), Countess of Mercatello sul Metauro, Lady of Massa Trabaria
 Gerberge of Provence (1060–1115), Countess of Provence and Arles, 1093–1115
 Gersende of Bigorre (d. 1032/34), Countess of Bigorre
 Gersende of Forcalquier, Countess of Forcalquier, 1209–?
 Gersende of Sabran (1180–1242), Countess of Forcalquier
 Garsende II of Sabran, Lady of Forcalquier
 Gersende of Urgel, Lady of Forcalquier, 1209–?
 Gertrud of Nordheim (1115–1154/65), Countess of Bentheim
 Giordana of Sanseverino, Lady of Solofra
 Giovanna Carafa, Countess of Roddi, 1525–34
 Gisela Agnes of Rath (1669–1740), Countess of Nienburg, 1694–1740
 Grapella dalle Carceri, Princs of Euboea, 1262–64
 Guglielma Pallavicini (d. 1358), Lady of Thermopylae, Marchioness of Bodonitsa, 1311
 Guillemette of Neufchâtel (1270–1317), also known as Guillemette of Neuenburg, Lady of Montbéliard
 Guillermina, Countess of Pallars-Soubira
 Guinidilda of Roussillon, heiress of Miron I, Count of Roussillon
 Guinodeon, Countess of Porhoet
 Guirande of Dax, Viscountess of Dax
 Guiscarda of Béarn, Viscountess of Béarn, 1134–54
 Guyonne of Salins, Lady of Salins

H
 Hatshepsut, Pharaoh of Egypt
 Hawise of Blois, Countess of Aumale, 1179–94
 Hedwig of Bentheim (d. c. 1371), Heiress of Bentheim
 Hedwig of Ravensberg, Heiress of Lordship of Dale, 1166
 Heilwig of Kyburg (d. 1260), Countess of Kyburg
 Hélène d'Anjou, Ruler of Zeta, 1276–1309
 Helissende of Perche, Countess of Perche
 Helvis, Lady of Catheu
 Helvise of Ramleh, Lady of Ramleh
 Henrietta Churchill, Duchess of Marlborough, 1722–33
 Henriette of Cleves (1552–1601), Countess of Rethel & Duchess of Nevers, 1564–1601
 Henriette of Grandson (d. 1322), Lady of Grandson and la Sarraz
 Henriette, Countess of Montbéliard, also known as Henriette of Montfaucon (1387–1444), Countess of Montbeliard, 1397–1444
 Henriette Catherine of Joyeuse (1585–1654), Lady of Roches, Countess of Bouchage, Duchess of Joyeuse, 1608–47; Princess of Joinville, 1641–54
 Hildiarde of Oisy, Viscountess of Meux
 Hortense Mancini, Duchess of Mayenne, Mazarin & Rethel, 1661–69
 Humberge of Limoges, also known as Brunisende of Limoges, Viscountess of Limoges, 1194–1253

I
 Ida of Boulogne, Countess of Mortain, 1204–16
 Ide-Raymonde of Forez, Countess of Forez
 Ii Naotora, 18th head of the Ii clan (d. 1582)
 Ilaria Scillato, Lady of Ceppaloni
 Ippolita I Ludovisi (1663–1724), Princess of Piombino, 1700–24
 Irene the Athenian, Byzantine Empress, 797–802
 Irene Palaeologina, Empress of Trebizond, 1340–41
 Irmgard of Plotzkau (1070/80–1153), Heiress of County of Walbeck
 Irmgard of Wevelinghoven (d. 1474), Heiress of Lordship of Alfter
 Isabeau of Antoing (d. 1354), Burgravine of Ghent
 Isabeau of Carlat, Viscountess of Carlat, 1303–?
 Isabeau of Carlat, Lady of Carlat
 Isabeau of Craon, Lady of Craon
 Isabeau of Germaines (d. 1341), Lady of Germaines
 Isabeau of Ghistelle, Countess of Harnes, 1386–1413
 Isabeau of Thouars, Lady of Mauleon & Talmond, Viscountess of Thouars, Countess of Benon & Dreux
 Isabeau of Vivonne, Lady of Regnac
 Isabel of Brazil (1846–1921), heiress presumptive of the Empire of Brazil and regent on three occasions.
 Isabel, widow of Ravano dalle Carceri, Lord of Euboea, 1209–16; Princess of Euboea, 1216–20
 Isabel of Aragon (1409–1443), Countess of Urgell, 1433–43
 Isabel de Mauduit, heiress of County of Warwick
 Isabel Douglas, Countess of Mar, Countess of Mar and Lady of Garioch, 1391–1404
 Isabel Teles de Molina (1290–?), 10th Lady of Menezes
 Isabel de Warenne, heiress of Warenne
 Isabella I of Castile, Queen of Castile, 1474–1504
 Isabella of England (1332–1379), Countess of Soissons, 1365
 Isabella, Duchess of Lorraine
 Isabella II of Spain, Queen of Spain, 1833–68
 Isabella of Gloucester (1170–1217), Countess of Gloucester
 Isabella of Ibelin, Lady of Beirut, 1264–82
 Isabella of Jerusalem, Queen of Jerusalem, 1190–1206
 Isabella of Oultrejourdain, Lady of Oultrejourdain
 Isabella Appiani, also known as Isabella d'Appiani d'Aragon, Lady of Piombino & Elba, 1590–94; Princess of Piombino, 1594–1661
 Isabella Pallavicini, Marchioness of Bodonitsa, 1278–86
 Isabella of Roucy, Countess of Roucy, ?–1379
 Isabella of Spain (1566–1633), Countess of Charolais, 1598–1633, Countess Palatine of Burgundy, 1598–1633
 Isabella of Clermont, Princess of Taranto, 1463–65
 Infanta Isabella Clara Eugenia of Spain
 Isabella de Warenne (1137–1199), Countess of Surrey
 Isabella da Ponte, Heiress of Tagliacozzo
 Isabelle of Albret (d. 1294), Lady of Albret & Viscountess of Maremne, 1283–94
 Isabelle, Lady of Argos and Nauplia
 Isabelle of Angoulême (1187–1246), Countess of Angoulême, 1202–46
 Isabelle of Beaujeau (d. 1297), Lady of Beaujeau, 1250–97
 Isabelle of Beauvau (1436–1474), Lady of La-Roche-sur-Yon, Lady of Champigny-sur-Vende
 Isabelle of Brienne (1305–1360), Countess of Conversano, 1356–60, Countess of Lecce, 1356–60, Countess of Brienne, 1356–60.
 Isabelle of Chartres (d. 1248/1249), Lady of Amboise (before 1218) and Countess of Chartres (after 1218)
 Isabelle of Coucy (d. 1411), Countess of Soissons, ?–1411
 Isabelle of Dreux (1160–1239), Lady of Baudemont
 Isabelle of Foix (1360–1426), Viscountess of Béarn & Castelbon & Countess of Foix, 1398–1412
 Isabelle of France (1158–1197), Countess of Vexin
 Isabella, Countess of Vertus (1348–1373), Countess of Vertus 1361–73
 Isabelle of Luxemburg (d. 1472), Countess of Guise
 Isabelle of Mayenne (d. 1257), Lady of Mayenne, 1220–57
 Isabelle of Rumigny (1263–1322), Lady of Rumigny, 1270–1322
 Isabelle I of Villehardouin (1260–1311), Princess of Achaea, 1289–97, 1301–07

J
 Jacqueline, Countess of Hainaut, Lady of Friesland & Countess of Hainaut, Holland & Zeeland, 1417–32
 Jacqueline of Bethune, Countess of Harnes, 1413–42
 Jacqueline of Bethune (d. 1457), Vidamese of Amiens
 Jacqueline de Longwy (d. 1561), Countess of Bar-sur-Seine
 Jadwiga the Saint, Queen of Poland, 1384–99
 Jakoba of Bavaria (1401–36), Countess of Holland, Hainaut and Zeeland, 1417–32
 Lady Jane Grey (1536/1537 – 12 February 1554), also known as Lady Jane Dudley[3] or The Nine Days' Queen,[4] was an English noblewoman and de facto monarch of England from 10 July until 19 July 1553.
 Jeanne de Scepeaux, Countess of Chemilles, Duchess of Beaupreau
 Jeanne de la Guerche, Lady of La Guerche, Pouance & Chateau-Gnthier
 Jeanne of Albret, Countess of Dreux (d. 1444)
 Jeanne of Argies (d. 1334), Lady of Catheu
 Jeanne of Avaugour (d. 1327), Countess of Goello and Avaugour
 Jeanne of Avaugour, Countess of Penthièvre, 1334–84
 Jeanne, Dauphine d'Auvergne (1414–1436), Countess of Clermont-en-Beauvaisis, Countess of Sancerre, 1419–36, Dauphine of Auvergne
 Jeanne I of Auvergne, Duchess of Auvergne
 Jeanne of Avesnes (1323–1350), Lady of Chimay & Countess of Soissons, 1350
 Jeanne of Bar (1415–1462), Countess of Soissons & Marle
 Jeanne of Beaujeau (d. 1308), Lady of Montpensier, 1285–1308
 Jeanne I of Beaujeau (1345–1346), also known as Jeanne of Dreux, Lady of Montpensier, 1345–46
 Jeanne of Bethune (d. 1450). Viscountess of Meaux, 1408–50
 Jeanne of Bourbon (d. 1487), Lady of Rochefort
 Jeanne of Brabant, Duchess of Brabant, 1355–1406, Duchess of Limburg, 1355–96
 Jeanne of Brienne, Lady of Seans-en-Othe
 Jeanne of Brienne (d. 1389), Lady of Chateau-Chinon, 1351–89, which she inherited from her mother Jeanne of Mello
 Jeanne I of Burgundy, Countess Palatine of Burgundy, 1200–05
 Jeanne II, Countess of Burgundy (1292–1330), Countess Palatine of Burgundy, 1307–30, Lady of Salins, 1303–23, Countess of Artois, 1329–30
 Jeanne of Châtellerault (1235–1315), Viscountess of Châtellerault
 Jelena Gruba, (1345–1399), Queen of Bosnia (1391 to 1398), first as queen consort until 1395 and then as queen regnant, she was the only female head of state in the history of Bosnia and Herzegovina.
 Joanna of Châtillon, Duchess of Athens, 1311
 Jeanne of Chiny (1210–56), Countess of Chiny
 Jeanne of Clermont (d. 1436), Countess of Clermont, Dauphine of Auvergne
 Jeanne of Dammartin, Countess of Mortain, 1245–51
 Jeanne of Dammartin (1216–1279), Countess of Aumale, 1239–79, Countess of Montreuil & Ponthieu, 1251–79
 Jeanne of Dreux, Countess of Braine
 Jeanne I of Dreux (1345–1346), Countess of Dreux, Countess of Joigny
 Jeanne II of Dreux (1309–1355), Countess of Dreux, Countess of Joigny
 Jeanne of Flanders, Countess of Flanders & Hainaut, 1205–44
 Jeanne of Forez (d. 1369), Countess of Forez
 Jeanne III, Countess of Burgundy, Countess Palatine of Burgundy & Countess of Artois, 1330–47
 Jeanne of Ham, Lady of Ham
 Jeanne of Harcourt, Lady of Aigle
 Jeanne of Harcourt (1372–1456), Lady of Montaigle
 Jeanne of Harcourt (d. 1488), Countess of Tancarville, 1484–88
 Jeanne of Joigny (d. 1454), Lady of Grignon, Countess of Joigny
 Jeanne of Joinville, Countess of Joigny
 Jeanne of Luxemburg (d. 1407), Countess of Ligny, Duchess of Saint-Fergau, Lady of Roussy
 Jeanne of Luxembourg (d. 1430), also known as Demoiselle de Luxemburg, Countess of Ligny & Saint-Pol, 1430, Lady of Roussy
 Jeanne of Mello (d. 1351), Lady of Chateau-Chinon
 Jeanne of Montfaucon (d. 1445), Lady of Montfaucon
 Jeanne of Montpensier (d. 1308), Countess of Montpensier
 Jeanne III of Navarre (1528–1572), Viscountess of Béarn, Limoges, Lomagne, Maremne & Tartas, 1555–72, Countess of Armagnac, Dreux, Fezensac, Foix, Gause, Guisnes, l'Isle-Jourdain, Pardiac, Perche, Périgord, Porhoet & Rodez, 1555–72, Duchess of Albret, 1555–72
 Jeanne of Penthièvre (1319–1384), also known as Joan the Lame or Joan, Duchess of Brittany, Viscountess of Limoges & Countess of Avaugour & Penthièvre, 1331–84
 Joanna of Pfirt (1300–1351), Countess of Pfirt
 Jeanne of Pierrepont (1406–1459), Lady of Braine, Lady of Roucy
 Jeanne of Ponthieu (d. 1376), Lady of Épernon
 Jeanne of Rethel (1277–1328), Countess of Rethel, 1285–1328
 Jeanne of Soissons (1323–1350), Countess of Soissons
 Jeanne of Tancarville, Heiress of Tancarville
 Jeanne of Tancarville (d. 1488), Countess of Tancarville, Baroness of Montgomery, Lady of Varenquebec, Parthenay, Montreuil-Bellay, Estrapagny
 Jeanne of Toulouse (1220–71), Countess of Toulouse, 1249–71
 Jeanne of Vaudemont (1458–1480), Countess of Aumale, Countess of Guise, Countess of Mortain
 Jimena Diaz, Lady of Valencia, 1099–1102
 Jindeok of Silla (647–654), Queen of Korea
 Jinseong of Silla (887–897), Queen of Korea
 Joan, Countess of Blois (1258–1292), also known as Jeanne of Châtillon, Lady of Avesnes & Countess of Blois, Chartres & Dunois, 1280–91
 Joan, Duchess of Brittany (1319–1384), Duchess of Brittany, 1341–84
 Joan I of Navarre, Countess of Champagne, 1274–1305
 Joan I of Naples (1326–1381), Lady of Forcalquier, 1373–81, Countess of Provence, 1373–81, Princess of Achaea, 1373–81, Duchess of Calabria, 1373–81, Queen of Naples
 Joan II of Naples, Queen of Naples
 Joan II of Navarre, Queen of Navarre, 1328–49, Countess of Mortain, 1328–49
 Joan III of Navarre (1528–1572), Queen of Navarre; Her full titles: Queen of Navarre, Countess of Foix, Bigorre & Périgord; Viscountess of Béarn & Limoges (inherited from her father); Duchess of Alençon & Berry, Countess of Rodez, Armagnac, Perche, Fezensac, L’Isle-Jourdain, Porhoet, Pardiac, Viscountess of Lomagne, Fezenzaguet, Brulhois, Cressey, Auvillars, Baroness of Castelnau, Caussade, Montmiral, Lady of La Fleche and Bauge (inherited from her mother)
 Joan of Kent (1328–1385), also known as the Fair Maid of Kent, Lady Joan Plantagenet, 5th Baroness Wake of Liddell & Countess of Kent, 1352–85
 Joanna of Durazzo, Duchess of Durazzo 1348–68
 Johanna of Baden-Hochberg, Margravine of Rothelin, 1503–43, Countess of Neuchâtel, 1503–43
 Johanna of Forbach, Lady of Rixingen
 Joice Lado, Lady of South Sudan
 Jordane of Grandson, Lady of Belmont
 Jordane de La Sarraz, Lady of Belmont
 Juana the Mad, Queen of Castile, 1504–55
 Juliana of the Netherlands, Queen of the Netherlands, 1948–80
 Juliane de Leyburn, Baroness Leyburn
 Juana of Portugal, Countess of Mortain, 1250–51
 Juana de Panyafiel (1339–1381), Lady of Lara, Lady of Vizcaya
 Juana Nunez de Lara (1285–1351), Lady of Herrera, Lady of Lara
 Juliana Grenier, Lady of Caesarea, 1187–1219
 Jusiana de Entenza, Lady of Alcolea
 Jutta of Ravensberg (d. after 1302), Heiress of Vechta and Vlotho

K
 Kamasarye Philoteknos (180–150 BC) Queen regnant of the Bosporan Kingdom
 Katharina of Saffenberg, countess of Neuenahr
 Khentkaus I, possibly a regent for one of her sons, a Pharaoh of Egypt
 Kittur Chennamma (1778–1829), Indian freedom fighter and Rani of the Kittur
 Kubaba, only queen on the Sumerian king list
 Kunigunde of Dale (d. 1350), Heiress of Dale-Diepenheim

L
 Lakshmibai, Queen (Rani) of Maratha-ruled Jhansi State, India 1853–58. She was one of the leading figures of the Indian Rebellion of 1857 and became for Indian nationalists a symbol of resistance to the rule of the British East India Company in the subcontinent.
 Laodice (fl. 2nd century BC) Queen of the Kingdom of Pontus, likely a co-ruler with her husband
 Laure of Chabanais (1245–?), Countess of Bigorre, 1255–?
 Laure of Montfort (d. 1270), Lady of Épernon and Gambais
 Lauretta of Saarbrücken, Countess of Saarbrücken, 1252–71
 Leonor de Cabrera (1264–?), Heiress of Urgel
 Leonore of Rohan (1539–1583), Countess of Rochefort
 Liegarde of Chalon, Duchess of Burgundy
 Lili'uokalani (1838–1917), Queen of the Kingdom of Hawaii, 1891–93
 Liutgarde of Falkenstein, Countess of Falkenstein
 Louise of Albret (d. 1531), Viscountess of Limoges
 Louise of Arberg (d. 1519), Countess of Valangin, 1518–19
 Louise of Aumont (1759–1826), Duchess of la Meilleraye, Mayenne & Rethel, 1781–89
 Louise de Bourbon, Duchess of Montpensier (1483–1561), also known as Louise de Bourbon, Countess of Mortain, 1530–61, Countess of Montpensier, 1538–39, Duchess of Montpensier, 1522–61, Dauphine of Auvergne, 1538–61, Duchess of Auvergne, 1538–61
 Louise of Clermont, Lady of Baux, 1403–21
 Louise of Luxemburg-Saint-Pol (1567–1647), Countess of Brienne, 1608–47
 Louise of Savoy (1476–1531), Countess of Beaumont-en-Anjou, 1515–16, Countess of Maine, 1515–31, Countess of Beaufort, Countess of Gien, Duchess of Beaufort, 1515–18, Duchess of Angoulême, 1515–31; Duchess of Anjou, 1515–31, Duchess of Nemours, 1524–31, Duchess of Bourbon, 1527–31
 Louise de Beon, Countess of Brienne, Countess of Brienne, 1647–?.
 Louise Élisabeth de Bourbon, Duchess of Étampes, 1718–52
 Louise Jean de Durfort (1735–1781), Duchess of la Meilleraye, Mayenne, Mazarin & Rethel, 1738–81
 Louise Henriette de Bourbon, Duchess of Étampes, 1752–59
 Louise Hippolyte of Monaco (1697–1731), Princess of Monaco, 1731
 Louise Marie Adélaïde de Bourbon, also known as Louise Marie Adélaïde of Bourbon-Penthièvre, Duchess of Aumale, 1814–21, Countess of Eu, 1793–1821
 Louise-Renée de Pénancoët de Kéroualle, Baroness of Petersfield, Countess of Fareham, 1st Duchess of Portsmouth & 1st Duchess of Aubigny
 Lucia of Tripoli, Countess of Tripoli, 1287–89
 Lucrezia Pignatelli (1704–1760), 4th Princess of Strongoli, 6th Countess of Melissa, Duchess of Tolve
 Luisa Manrique of Lara, Duchess of Najera, 1558–85
 Lukarde of Leiningen, Heiress of Leiningen
 Lý Chiêu Hoàng (1218–1278), Queen regnant of Vietnam, the only female emperor in Vietnamese history
 Lyonette of Geneva, Lady of Gex

M
 Mabille of Bellem (d. 1082), Lady of Belleme, 1070–82; Countess of Alençon
 Madeleine Charlotte of Piney-Luxembourg, Countess of Ligny & Duchess of Piney-Luxemburg, 1680–1701
 Mafalda Manrique of Lara, also known as Mafalda Gonzalez, Lady of Molina, 1239–48
 Magdalena of Neuenahr, Heiress of Limburg
 Magdalena Christina of Sayn, Countess Sayn-Hachenburg, 1661–1715
 Mahaut of Artois (1268–1329), Countess of Artois, 1302–29
 Mahaut I of Courtenay (1185–1257), Countess of Nevers, 1192–1257
 Mahaut of Courtenay (c. 1254–1303), Countess of Chieti
 Mahaut II of Dampierre (1234–1262), Lady of Broigny, Donzy, Montjoy, Perche-Goet, Saint Aignan & Torigny, 1254–62, Lady of Bourbon, 1257–62, Countess of Auxerre, Nevers & Tonnerre, 1257–62
 Mahaut of Dammartin, Countess of Aumale, 1216–59
 Mahaut of Grignon (d. 1192), Countess of Grignon and Tonnerre
 Maleqorobar (266–283) Queen of Kush
 Mania (c. 440–399 BC) ruler of Dardanus
 Margaret de Newburg, Countess of Warwick (d. 1253)
 Margaret of Salisbury (1473–1541), 8th Countess of Salisbury, also known as Margaret Plantagenet, Blessed Margaret Pole
 Margaret, Countess of Blois (d. 1230)
 Maria, ruler of the Tehuelche 
 Margaret, Countess of Carrick (d. 1292), also known as Marjorie of Carrick
 Margaret Maultasch, Countess of Tyrol
 Margaret of Austria, Duchess of Savoy (1480–1530), Countess of Charolais, 1493–1530, Countess Palatine of Burgundy, 1493–1530, Countess of Artois, 1493–1530
 Margaret of Béarn (1245–1319), Countess of Bigorre
 Margaret of Dampierre, Countess of Rethel, 1384–1402
 Margaret of Enghien (1365–1397), Countess of Conversano
 Margaret I, Countess of Burgundy, Lady of Salins, 1361–82, Countess Palatine of Burgundy, 1361–82, Countess of Artois, 1361–82
 Margaret I of Flanders, Countess of Flanders & Hainaut, 1244–80
 Margaret of Freiburg (d. 1300/39), Heiress of Badenweiler
 Margaret I of Holland (1311–1356),
 Margaret II of Flanders, Countess of Hainaut, Holland & Zeeland, 1345–49
 Margaret III, Countess of Flanders
 Margaret of Limburg (d. 1479), Heiress of Bedburg & Hakenbroich
 Margaret of Lorraine-Adamant (d. 1477), Lady of Arschot
 Margaret, Countess of Mar, Countess of Mar, 1374–91
 Margaret of Norfolk (1320–1399), Duchess of Norfolk, 1397–99, 2nd Countess of Norfolk, 1338–99
 Margaret of Reyghersvliet, Countess of Harnes, ?–1340
 Margaret of Salisbury, also known as Margaret Longespee, Countess of Salisbury
 Margaret of Zeeland, Countess of Zeeland, 1345–54
 Margaret Wake, 3rd Baroness Wake (1300–1349), Baroness Wake of Liddell, 1349
 Margareta of Gleichen (1480–1567), Countess of Gleichen in Blankenhain
 Margarethe of Courtenay, Margravine of Namur
 Margarethe of Marck (1527–1599), Countess of Arenberg
 Margarethe of Ravensberg (d. 1389), Heiress of Ravensberg and Berg
 Margery of Warwick (d. 1253), Countess of Warwick
 Margherita di Chiaramonte, sister and heiress of Ugone, Count of Chiaramonte, Lord of Castronovo, Noja, Torremare and Sevisio
 Margherita di Sangineto (d. after 1380), Countess of Altomonte and Corigliano
 Marguerite de Neuilly, Lady of Passava; Heiress of Akova
 Margrethe II of Denmark (b. 1940), Queen of Denmark, 1972–present
 Marguerite de Navarre, Duchess of Berry, 1517–49, Duchess of Alençon & Countess of Perche, 1525–49?
 Marguerite of Alençon (1503–?), Countess of Alençon
 Marguerite of Amboise (d. 1475), Princess of Talmond, Viscountess of Thouars, Lady of Mauleon, Lady of Montrichard
 Marguerite of Angoulême, Duchess of Alençon & Berry, Countess of Rodez, Armagnac, Perche, Fezensac, L’Isle-Jourdain, Porhoet, Pardiac, Viscountess of Lomagne, Fezenzaguet, Brulhois, Cressey, Auvillars, Baroness of Castelnau, Caussade, Montmiral, Lady of La Fleche and Bauge
 Marguerite of Anjou and Maine (1273–1299), Countess of Anjou and Maine, 1290–99
 Marguerite of Armagnac (d. 1504), Duchess of Nemours and Countess of Guise & Pardiac, 1503–04
 Marguerite of Bauge (d. c. 1252), Lady of Miribel
 Marguerite of Béarn (1245–1319), Viscountess of Béarn, 1290–1301
 Marguerite of Beaumont (d. 1307), Countess of Charmerlan
 Marguerite of Berrie, Lady of Berrie
 Marguerite of Bigorre, Countess of Bigorre, 1290–1301
 Marguerite of Blois (1170–1230), Lady of Romorantin & Millancay & Countess of Dunois & Blois, 1218–30
 Marguerite of Blois (d. 1419), Countess of Sancerre, Lady of Charenton
 Marguerite of Brittany (1392–1428), Lady of Guillac
 Margaret of Burgundy, Queen of Sicily (1250–1308), Countess of Tonnerre, 1262–1308
 Marguerite of Comminges (1363–1443), Countess of Comminges, 1375
 Marguerite of Dampierre (d. 1316), Lady of Dampierre and Saint-Dizier
 Marguerite of Enghien (1365–1397), Countess of Brienne, 1394–97
 Marguerite of Joigny, Countess of Joigny, Lady of Pouilly and Premartin
 Marguerite of Joinville (1354–1418), Lady of Joinville & Countess of Vaudemont, 1365–1415
 Marguerite of Lorraine (1463–1521), Lady of Mayenne, 1499–1509
 Marguerite of Macon (d. 1257/59), Lady of Salins, 1219–25
 Marguerite of Melun (d. 1448), Countess of Tancarville, 1415–48
 Marguerite of Nesle (1300–1350), Lady of Argies & Chimay & Countess of Soissons, 1306–50
 Marguerite of Orléans (1406–1466), Countess of Vertus
 Marguerite de Rohan (1616/17–1684), Duchess of Rohan and Frontenay, Princess of León and Soubise, Countess of Porhoet
 Marguerite of Soissons (d. 1350), Lady of Chimay and Countess of Soissons, 1307–15
 Marguerite Grenier, Lady of Caesarea, 1239–64
 Marguerite of Lusignan, Lady of Tyre, 1284–86
 Marguerite of Montmorency (1175–?), Lady of Verneuil, Poissy, Vernouillet and Meulan
 Marguerite of Nesle (1300–1350), Lady of Catheu, 1334–50
 Marguerite of Valois, Countess of Auvergne, 1608–10, Duchess of Étampes, 1582–98
 Marguerite Charlotte of Piney-Luxembourg, Countess of Ligny & Duchess of Piney-Luxemburg, 1616–80
 Maria de Urgell (d. 1196), Señora de Almenara
 Maria dalle Carceri (d. 1323), Heiress of 1/6 of Euboea as the daughter of Gaetano dalle Carceri; Marquise (1/2) of Bodonitsa, 1311–58, as the widow of Albert Pallavicini. She shared Bodonitsa with their daughter, Guglielma.
 Maria of Antioch-Armenia, Lady of Toron, 1229–66
 Maria of Cleves (1553–?), Duchess of Cleves
 Maria of Hornes (d. 1434), Countess of Hornes, Lady of Duffel and Waelheim
 Mary, Queen of Hungary (1371–1395), Queen of Croatia, 1382–95, Queen of Hungary, 1382–95
 Maria of Jever, Lady of Jever, 1511–75
 Maria of Molina, Lady of Molina, 1293?–1322?
 Maria of Montferrat, Queen of Jerusalem, 1205
 Maria I of Portugal (1734–1816), Queen of Portugal, 1777–1816
 Maria of Randerath (d. 1395), Lady of Randerath
 Maria of Vianden (c. 1337–1400), Countess of Vianden
 Maria Albina of Hauteville (d. after 1205), Countess of Lecce
 Maria Angelina Ducena Palaeologina, Ruler of Epirus, 1385–86
 Maria Beatrice Ricciarda (1750–1829), Sovereign Duchess of Massa, Sovereign Princess of Carrara, 1790–97, 1814–29, 7th Duchess of Ajello, Baroness of Paduli and Lady of Lago, Laghitello, Serra e Terrati, Princess of Modena and Reggio
 Maria del Pilar Garcia Sancho y Zabala, Duchess of Najera, 1864
 Maria Eleonora I Boncompagni (1686–1745), also known as Maria Eleoonora I Boncompagni-Ludovisi, Marchioness of Populonia, Countess of Conza, Princess of Piombino, 1707–45
 Maria Lopez of Haro, Lady of Vizcaya, 1311–25, 1326–33
 Maria Luisa de Aragon y Pernstein (d. 1663), 6th Duchess of Luna, 7th Duchess of Villahermosa.
 Maria Manuela of Portugal (1538–1587), Duchess of Viseu.
 Maria Pacheco (c. 1400–?), Lady of Belmonte
 Maria Teresa Cybo-Malaspina, Duchess of Massa, Sovereign Duchess of Massa, Sovereign Princess of Carrara, 6th Duchess of Ajello, Baroness of Paduli, Sovereign Lady of Moneta and Avenza, Lady of Lago, Laghitello, Serra and Terrati
 Maria Theresa of Austria (1717–1780), Queen of Croatia, 1743–80, Queen of Hungary, 1740–80
 Maria da Varona, Princess of Euboea, 1317–37
 Maria dalle Carceri, Princess of Euboea, 1279–96
 Maria II Zaccaria, Princes of Achaea, 1402–04
 Maria II of Portugal (1819–1853), Queen of Portugal, 1826–28 and 1834–53
 Marie de Béarn (d. 1186), Heiress of Béarn, 1170
 Marie de Sully, Lady of Sully, Lady of Craon, Countess of Guînes, Sovereign Princess of Boisbelle
 Marie of Albret (1491–1549), Lady of Orval & Countess of Rethel, 1500–40
 Marie of Alençon (d. 1549), Countess of Alençon
 Marie Antoinette (1755–1793), Archduchess of Austria, Dauphine of France, 1770–74, Queen of France and Navarre, 1774–92
 Marie of Artois (d. 1365), Lady of Merode
 Marie of Aumale, Countess of Aumale, 1239–51
 Marie of Avesnes (d. 1280), Lady of Avesnes, Countess of Blois, 1241–80
 Marie of Baux (d. 1417), Princess of Orange, 1393–1417
 Marie of Belleme (1199–1250), Lady of Ponthieu
 Marie of Berry (1367–1434), Countess of Montpensier, 1416–34, Duchess of Auvergne, 1400–34
 Marie of Berry (d. 1425), Countess of Montpensier
 Marie of Bois-Belle, Princess of Bois Belle
 Marie of Boulogne, Countess of Mortain, 1167–73
 Marie of Bourbon, also known as Marie of Bourbon-Vendôme, (1539–1601), Countess of Gace, Hambye and Briquebec, Countess of Saint-Pol, 1546–1601, Duchess of Estouteville
 Marie of Bourbon (1315–1387), Princess of Achaea and Morea, 1364–70 (Abd)
 Marie de Bourbon-Conde (1606–1692), Countess of Soissons, 1612–92
 Marie de Bourbon-Montpensier (1605–1627), Countess of Mortain & Duchess of Châtellerault, Montpensier & Saint-Fergau, 1608–1627
 Marie of Brittany, Lady of La Guerche (1391–1446), Lady of La Guerche
 Marie of Châtillon (1343–1404), Lady of Guise and Mayenne, 1360–1404
 Marie of Châtillon, Vidamese of Laon
 Marie of Coucy (1366–1405) Countess of Soissons, 1398–1405
 Marie of Enghien (d. 1318), Lady of Zotteghem, Burgravine of Ghent 
 Marie of Enghien, Lady of Argos and Nauplia, 1376–88
 Marie II of Enghien (1367–1446), also known as Mary of Enghien, Lady of Castro & Countess of Lecce & Brienne, 1384–1446
 Marie of Flanders (d. 1350), Viscountess of Chateaudun
 Marie of Ham, Lady of Ham
 Marie, Countess of Harcourt (1398–1476), Lady of Arschot, Brionne, Elbeuf, Forcalquier, L'Islebonne, & La Saussaye & Countess of Aumale, Harcourt & Mortain, 1452–76
 Marie-Adélaïde, Grand Duchess of Luxembourg (1894–1924), was reigning Grand Duchess of Luxembourg from 1912 to 1919
 Marie of Limoges (1260–1291), Viscountess of Limoges, 1263–91
 Marie of Looz (d. 1408), Lady of Château-Thierry, 1372–1408
 Marie of Lorraine (1615–1688), 8th Duchess of Guise, Duchess of Joyeuse & Princess of Joinville, 1675–88
 Marie of Lusignan, Countess d'Eu, Countess of Eu, 1250–60
 Marie of Luxemburg (1472–1547), also known as Marie de Luxemburg, Viscountess of Meaux & Countess of Ligny, Marle & Soissons, 1482–1547, 24th or 25th Countess of Saint-Pol, 1482–1547
 Marie of Luxemburg (1562–1623), Duchess of Étampes & Penthièvre, 1569–1623
 Marie of Montmirail (d. 1272), Heiress of Montmirail, Oisy, Crèvecœur, Conde-en-Brie, the Viscounty of Meaux & Chatelainie of Cambrai, Lady of Conde-Brie
 Marie of Montpellier (d. 1219), Lady of Montpellier, 1205–13
 Marie of Orléans-Longueville (1625–1707), also known as Marie de Longueville, Duchess of Estouteville, Sovereign Princess of Neuchâtel & Countess of Valangin, 1699–1707
 Marie of Ponthieu (1186–1251), Countess of Montreuil & Pontannhieu, 1221–51
 Marie of Rethel, Countess of Rethel, 1243–45
 Marie II Zaccharia, Princess of Achaea, 1402–04
 Marie of Vilademuls, Lady of Vilademuls
 Marie Anne de Bourbon, Duchess of Étampes, 1712–18
 Marie Jeanne Baptiste of Savoy, Duchess of Aumale, 1659–86
 Marie Liesse of Luxemburg-Saint-Pol (1611–1660), Princess of Tingry
 Marie Sophie Colbert (d. 1747), Margravine of Seignelay & Countess of Tancarville
 Marquesa of Ampurias (1322–27), Countess of Ampurias
 Marquise of Cabrera, Viscountess of Cabrera
 Mary I of England, Queen of England, 1553–58
 Mary II of England, Queen of England, 1689–94
 Mary, Queen of Scots, 1542–67
 Mary, Countess of Blois (1200–1241), also known as Marie of Avesnes, Lady of Romorantin and Millancay & Countess of Dunois & Blois, 1230–41 and Lady of Chateaurenault and Countess of Chartres, 1236–41
 Mary of Béarn (1145–1186), Viscountess of Bruilhois & Béarn, 1170–73
 Mary of Burgundy, also known as Mary the Rich, (1457–1482), Countess of Charolais & Zeeland, Countess Palatine of Burgundy, Duchess of Burgundy & Limburg, 1477–82
 Maria of Sicily, Duchess of Athens, 1377–88, Queen of Sicily, 1377–88
 Mary Scott, 3rd Countess of Buccleuch, Countess of Buccleuch, 1651–61
 Mascarose I of Armagnac, Countess of Armagnac & Fezensac, 1245–49
 Mascarose II of Lomagne, Countess of Armagnac, 1249–56, Viscountess of Fezensac, 1249–56
 Mathe I of Albret (d. 1283), Lady of Albret & Viscountess of Maremne, 1281–83
 Mathe of Bigorre (1225–1270), Viscountess of Marsan, 1255–70
 Mathilde of Amboise (d. 1256), Lady of Amboise, 1218–56
 Mathilde of Artois (d. 1329), Countess of Artois, 1302–29
 Mathilde of Baden (d. 1259), Lady of Stuttgart
 Mathilde of Bethune (1220–1264), Lady of Bethune, Dendermonde/Termonde, Richebourg and Warneton
 Mathilde II of Boulogne (1202–1262), Countess of Boulogne, 1216–62, Countess of Mortain, 1233–35, Countess of Dammartin
 Mathilde of Burgundy (d. 1005), Countess of Nevers
 Mathilde of Burgundy, Countess of Grignon
 Mathilde of Chalon, Lady of Donzy
 Mathilde of Chateau-du-Loir (d. 1099), heiress of Chateau-du-Loir
 Mathilde of Châtillon, also known as Mahaut of Châtillon, Countess of Saint Pol, 1369–72
 Mathilde of Hainaut, Princess of Achaea, 1313–18
 Mathilde of Heinsberg (d. 1189), Heiress of County Palatine of Sommerschenburg
 Mathilde of Landsberg (d. 1255), Regent Margravine of Brandenburg, 1220–25 for her son John I of Brandenburg (1208–1266)
 Mathilde of Rethel, Countess of Rethel, 1124–51
 Mathilde of Saarbrücken, Countess of Saarbrücken, 1271–74
 Matilda of Canossa (1046–1115), Lady of Canossa, Duchess of Tuscany, Countess of Reggio Emilia, Duchess of Spoleto, Margravine of Camerino
 Matilda of Dammartin (1202–1258), Countess of Dammartin, Countess of Boulogne
 Matilda of Grignon (d. 1192), Lady of Grignon
 Matilda of Hainaut, Princess of Achaea, 1313–18
 Maud of Lancaster (1339–1362), Countess of Leicester
 Mavia (4th century), Arab warrior-queen
 Muniadona of Castile, Countess of Ribagorza
 Mechtild of Brunswick-Lunenburg (1230–1298), Regent Countess of Anhalt-Aschersleben, 1266–70, for her sons Otto I and Heinrich III of Anhalt-Aschersleben.
 Mechtild of Guelders, Duchess of Guelders, 1371–84
 Mechtild of Reifferscheid (d. 1437), Heiress of Lordship of Bedburg
 Melisende of Arsuf, Lady of Arsuf, ?–1236
 Melisende of Chateaudun, Viscountess of Chateaudun
 Melisende of Jerusalem, Queen of Jerusalem, 1131–53
 Melissende of Maine (d. 890), heiress of Mayenne
 Mencia de Mendoza y Enriquez de Cabrera (d. 1619), Duchess of Huescar
 Merneith (around 2950 BC) regent and possibly a ruler of Egypt on her own right
 Meullent I of Castile, Countess of Aumale, 1279–1324
 Miroslawa of Pomerelia (d. 1233), Regent Duchess of Pomerania-Wolgast, 1220–33, for her son Barnim I of Pomerania-Wolgast (1219–1264)
 Munia Mayor of Castile (Munia Elvira)) (990–1066), 5th Countess of Castile

N
 Navarre of Soule, Viscountess of Soule
 Nawidemak (1st century BC or AD) Queen regnant of Kush
 Neferneferuaten (possibly identical with Nefertiti) Pharaoh of Egypt for a short time between 1336 and 1333 BC
 Neithhotep, queen and co-ruler of Egypt, possibly the first known female ruler
 Nicole of Châtillon (1424–1479), Countess of Penthièvre, 1454–79
 Nino, Regent Princess of Mingrelia, 1804–11
 Nuña Fernandez (Munia Domna), Lady of Amaya, Lady of Lara
 Nuña Núñez, Lady of Amaya
 Nyarroh (1880–1914), female chieftain in Barri region of Sierra Leone

O
 Oda of Altena, Regent Countess of Tecklenburg, 1202–06, for her son Otto (d. 1263)
 Oda of Hornes, Countess of Hornes
 Oda of Tecklenburg (d. 1244), also known as Gertrude of Tecklenburg, Heiress of Rheda
 Olimpia Ludovisi, Princess of Piombino, 1699–1700
 Olimpia Mancini (1639–1708), Countess of Soissons
 Olympias II of Epirus (3rd century BC), regent of Epirus
 Onna of Esens, Heiress of Esens, Wittmund and Stedesdorf

P
 Paola Colonna, Lady of Piombino, 1441–45
 Paolina Belmonte: Princess (Reichsfürstin) Donna Francesca di Paola Pignatelli y Aymerich Squarciafico Pinelli Ravaschieri Fieschi (1824–1911), 10th Princess of Belmonte, 5th Princess of the Holy Roman Empire, 3rd Princess of Muro Leccese, Grandee of Spain 1st Class, 9th Duchess of Acerenza, 3rd Duchess of Corigliano d'Otranto, 21st Countess of Copertino, 21st Marchioness of Galatone, 7th Marchioness of Argensola, 6th Marchioness of San Vicente, 11th Baroness of Badolato, Signora di Veglie, Leverano, San Cosimo &c.
 Paula of Maine, heiress of Maine
 Pauline of Anhalt-Bernburg, Regent Princess of Lippe, 1802–20, for Leopold II
 Peronelle of Chappes, Lady of Juilly and Lady of Chanloc
 Peronelle of Montfort, Lady of Rambouillet
 Petronila of Aragon, Queen of Aragon, 1137–64
 Petronille of Comminges (1185–1251), also known as Perenelle of Comminges, Viscountess of Marsan & Countess of Bigorre, 1225–51
 Petronille of Joigny (1230–82), Lady of Chateau-Renard, 1237–82
 Pheretima (d. 515 BC) regent of Cyrene
 Philiberte of Luxemburg-Saint-Pol (d. 1539), Countess of Charny
 Philiberte of Savoy, 1st Duchess of Nemours, 1498–1524
 Philippa of Clermont, Lady of Nesle
 Philippa of Harnes, Countess of Harnes, 1230–48
 Philippa Plantagenet, 5th Countess of Ulster, 13th Lady of Clare & 5th Countess of Ulster, 1363–1381/82
 Philippa of Lomagne (d. 1286/1294), Viscountess of Lomagne & Auvillar, 1276–1286/1294
 Philippa of Montspedon, Lady of Beaupreau
 Polie of Poitiers-Valentinois, Lady of Baux, 1348–?
 Prabhavatigupta, Queen of Vakataka Dynasty, known as the First female ruler of India
 Pulcheria, Empress of Rome, 450–453

 Ragnhild Haraldsdottir, Heiress of Jarald Gulskeg, Jarl of Sogn who brought her father's territory to her husband Halfdan the Black Gudrodsson (808–848)
 Ranavalona I, Queen of Madagascar, 1828–61
 Ranavalona II, Queen of Madagascar, 1868–83
 Ranavalona III, Queen of Madagascar, 1883–97
 Rasoherina, Queen of Madagascar, 1863–68
 Regine of Goth, also known as Reine of Got or Goth, Heiress to Lomagne & Auvillars
 Renee of Anjou (d. 1597), Duchess of Saint-Fergau, 1568–?, Marquise of Mézières, 1568–?
 Renee of Orléans (1508–1515), Countess of Dunois, Tancarville & Montgomery, 1513–15
 Renee of Savoy (1535–1587), Countess of Tende
 Ricciarda Malaspina (1497–1553), Duchess of Carrara, Duchess of Massa
 Richardis of Dyck, Lady of Dyck
 Richardis of Tecklenburg, Heiress of Tecklenburg-Ibbenburen
 Richinza of Spitzenburg (d. 1092/1110), Heiress of Kirchen
 Roscie du Caylar (d. after 1192), Lady of Uzes
 Razia Sultana (1236–1240), Ruler of India
 Rusudan of Georgia, Queen Regnant, 1223–45.
 Rudrama Devi (Rani), (1259−1289), Ruler of Kakatiya dynasty in the Deccan Plateau, India

S
 Salome Alexandra (141–67 BC) Queen of Judea
 Samsi (8th century BC) Arabian queen
 Sancha of Aybar (1017–70), Lady of Aybar
 Sancha of León (1037–1065), Queen of León
 Seondeok of Silla (632–647), Queen of Korea
 Shajar al-Durr (?–1257) Sultana of Egypt
 Shammuramat (811–808 BC) Regent of Assyria
 Shanakdakhete (reigned between 170–150 BC) Queen of Kush
 Sibilla of Cerdanya, Viscountess of Cerdanya, c. 1134–41
 Sibylla of Jerusalem, Queen of Jerusalem
 Sibylle of Baux (1255–1294), also known as Simone of Bauge, Sibylle of Bauge, Lady of Baux, Bresse & Miribel, 1268–93
 Sibylle of Baux, Lady of Baux, 1305–48
 Sibylle of Burgundy (1152–1201), Countess of Chalon
 Sibylle of Chateaurenault, Lady of Chateaurenault, 1140–?
 Sibylle of Palau, Viscountess of Bas
 Sobekneferu, Pharaoh of Egypt from 1806 to 1802 BC
 Soma (1st century) Queen of Funan, likely the first monarch of Cambodia
 Sophie of Arnsberg and Rietberg, Heiress of the Lordship of Rheda
 Sophie of Bar, Countess of Bar, 1033–92
 Stephanie of Ibelin, Lady of Nablus
 Stephanie of Milly (d. 1197), Lady of Oultrejourdain
 Suzanne of Bourbon (1491–1521), Countess of Clermont-en-Beauvaisis, Forez, Gien, & La Marche, 1503–21, Duchess of Auvergne & Bourbon, 1503–21

T
 Tabua (c. 675 BC) Arab queen
 Tamar of Georgia (1160–1213), Queen Regnant of Georgia from 1184 to 1213
 Te'el-hunu (c. 690 BC) Arab queen
 Teodora Gallucio (1200–60), Countess of Teano
 Teresa of León, Sovereign Countess of Portugal
 Teresa Álvarez de Azagra, Lady of Albarracín, c. 1281–c. 1283
 Teresa Antonia Manrique de Lara y Mendoza, 7th Marquesa de Canete, c. 1590
 Teresa Martins de Menezes (1290?), 5th Lady of Alburquerque
 Teresa de Entenza (1300–1327), Countess of Urgel, 1309–27
 Teuta (231–228/227 BC) Illyrian queen
 Theodora (11th century), Byzantine Empress, 1042, 1055–56
 Theodora Komnena, Empress of Trebizond, 1284–85
 Tiburge I of Orange (d. 1150), also known as Tiburtia of Orange, Countess of Orange
 Tiburge II of Orange, Countess of ½ of Orange, 1173–82. Married Bertrand of Baux (d. 1181).
 Tiburge III of Orange (d. 1180), Countess of Orange
 Toda of Ribagorza (d. 1011), Countess of Ribagorza
 Toda Galindez of Aragon (890–?), Countess of Sobrarbe
 Tomyris (d. 530 BC) Queen of the Massagetae
 Twosret (d. 1189 BC) Pharaoh of Egypt

U
 Ungu, Raja of Patani, 1624–1635
 Urraca of Castile, Queen of Castile and León, 1109–26
 Urraca of Castile (d. 1039), Lady of Infantado de Covarrubias.
 Urraca of León, Lady of Zamora
 Urraca Paterna (d. 861), Countess of Castile

V
 Valence of Pallars-Jussa, Countess of Pallars-Jussa
 Valentina Visconti (1366–1408), Countess of Asti, Countess of Vertus, 1373–1408
 Valpurge of Creyssel
 Verena of Freiburg (d. 1320), Heiress of Wartenberg and Mausach
 Victoire Armande Josephe of Rohan (1743–1807), Princess of Maubuisson
 Queen Victoria
 Violant of Hungary, Lady of Omelades, Lady of Montpellier
 Violant of Hungary, Viscountess of Millau

W
 Wilhelmina of the Netherlands, Queen of the Netherlands, 1890–1948
 Wisutthithewi, Queen of Lanna, 1564–1578

Y
 Yatie (c. 730 BC) Arab queen
 Yolande of Anjou, Duchess of Lorraine, 1473–83, Duchess of Bar, 1480–83
 Yolande of Brittany (1218–1272), also known as Yolande of Dreux, Countess of Penthièvre, 1237–72 (as her dowry); Countess of Porhoet (by grant of her brother); Countess Regent of Angoulême and La Marche, 1250–56, for her son Hugh XII of Lusignan
 Yolande of Burgundy (1248–2280), Countess of Nevers, 1262–80
 Yolande of Châtillon (1223–1254), Lady of Donzy, 1225–54
 Yolande of Dreux (1212–1248), Countess of Ossone
 Yolande of Dreux (1263–1322), Countess of Montfort-L’Aumary, 1311–22
 Yolande of Flanders (1331–1395), Lady of Cassel & Countess of Marle
 Yolande of Montfort (1263–1330), Countess of Montfort-l'Aumary

Z
 Zabibe (738–733 BC) Arab queen
 Zenobia (267–274), Queen of the Palmyrene Empire
 Zoe, Byzantine Empress, 1028–50

Notes

References

External links
 All the Heiresses in the Database
 Bodonitsa: List of Rulers
 The Byzantine Empire
 Catalan Hyperencyclopaedia 
 Counts and Kings of Castile
 Han van der Voort's Homepage
 Heiresses
 Henry IV (of) France('s) Mistresses and Bastards
 History of the Counts of Harnes
 History of Piombino
 The Holy Roman Empire
 The House Bentheim-Tecklenburg
 Latin Occupation in the Greek Lands
 Nevers and the Counts of Nevers
 An Online Encyclopedia of Roman Rulers and their Families
 Princes of Chimay
 The Rank/Title of Prince in France
 Women in Myth and Legends
  Conde
  The Counts of Chalon-sur-Saône
  The Counts of Mortain
  Maison de Bourbon-Vendôme (1412–1610)
  The Noble Families of the Kingdom, Duchy and County of Burgundy and of Franche-Comté
  Web Genealogie
  Genealogy of Noble Italian Families
  Counties of Catalonia
  Independent Iberian Lordships
  The Lords of Vizcaya

List
Female
Hereditary monarchs